The third round of qualifying matches for the 2010 FIFA World Cup from the CONCACAF section featured the 12 winners from the Second Round. The draw took place on 25 November 2007 in Durban, South Africa.

Format 
In this round, the winners from the Second Round were placed into three groups of four teams, determined by the draw. Here, they played a double round robin home and away schedule. The top two teams from each group advanced to the Fourth Round.

Group 1

Group 2

Group 3

Goalscorers 
A total of 103 goals were scored over 36 games, for an average of 2.86 goals per game.

4 goals

 Rodolfo Zelaya
 Keon Daniel

3 goals

 Bryan Ruiz
 Ramón Núñez
 Wensley Christoph

2 goals

 Ali Gerba
 Armando Alonso
 Alejandro Alpízar
 Celso Borges
 Froylan Ledezma
 Roy Myrie
 Alonso Solís
 Carlos Ruíz
 Luton Shelton
 Pável Pardo
 Dwight Yorke
 DaMarcus Beasley
 Brian Ching
 Clint Dempsey

1 goal

 Julian de Guzman
 Andrew Hainault
 Tomasz Radzinski
 Adrian Serioux
 Álvaro Saborío
 Walter Centeno
 Júnior Díaz
 Freddy Fernández
 Victor Núñez
 Jaime Colomé
 Roberto Linares
 Yénier Márquez
 Jensy Muñoz
 Allianni Urgelles
 Rudis Corrales
 César Larios
 Shawn Martin
 Eliseo Quintanilla
 William Torres
 José Manuel Contreras
 Carlos Gallardo
 Marco Pappa
 Mario Rodríguez
 Jean Alcénat
 Frantz Bertin
 Brunel Fucien
 Leonel Saint-Preux
 Carlos Costly
 Amado Guevara
 Julio César de León
 Walter Martínez
 Hendry Thomas
 Omar Cummings
 Ricardo Fuller
 Marlon King
 Andy Williams
 Fernando Arce
 Omar Bravo
 Andrés Guardado
 Jonny Magallon
 Rafael Márquez
 Carlos Salcido
 Matías Vuoso
 Clifton Sandvliet
 Russell Latapy
 Cornell Glen
 Kenwyne Jones
 Freddy Adu
 Jozy Altidore
 Carlos Bocanegra
 Michael Bradley
 Kenny Cooper
 Landon Donovan
 Charlie Davies
 Oguchi Onyewu

1 own goal

 Ricardo Osorio (against Honduras)
 Marlon Felter (against El Salvador)
 Derrik Garden (against El Salvador)

Notes

References

External links
FIFA.com
CONCACAF.com

3
Qual
qualification 2
qualification 2
qualification 2